Dmytro Ivanovych Dontsov (August 29, 1883 – March 30, 1973) was a Ukrainian nationalist writer, publisher, journalist and political thinker whose radical ideas, known as integral nationalism, were a major influence on the Organization of Ukrainian Nationalists.

Biography
Dontsov was born in Melitopol, Taurida Governorate (today Zaporizhzhia Oblast) to an old cossack officer's family, and in 1900 moved to Saint Petersburg to study law. In 1905 he joined the Ukrainian Social-Democratic Labor Party (USDRP) and met and befriended Symon Petliura. Dontsov's first published articles were published in the magazine Slovo which was edited by Petliura. Between 1905-1907, Dontsov was arrested twice due to his involvement in socialist politics. Dontsov moved to Lviv in April 1908, where in 1917 he completed his doctorate in law. In 1913, he quit the USDRP due to the conflict based on the national question.

During the time of the Ukrainian War of Independence, Dontsov served in the government of Hetman Pavlo Skoropadsky, where he became the head of the government's official news agency. During that time together with Vyacheslav Lypynsky and Volodymyr Shemet he created the Ukrainian Democratic-Agrarian Party (Khliboroby-Demokraty). With the fall of the Ukrainian State between 1919 and 1922, he lived in Switzerland, where he headed the press bureau of the Ukrainian People's Republic.
In 1922-1932, he was the editor-in-chief of the Literaturno-naukovyi vistnyk (Literary Scientific Herald). From 1933 to 1939, Dontsov was publishing and editing Vistnyk.

Ideology
In 1914, Dontsov moved to Lviv, where he became a founder member of the Union for the Liberation of Ukraine. He rejected the Marxist ideology he had previously found appealing. Dontsov was critical of ideas about pan-slavism, which had gained some popularity. Believing instead in a hierarchy of "master nations" and "plebian nations", Dontsov disdained pluralistic Western democracy, and recommended the ethno-nationalist model of fascist dictatorships of Mussolini and Hitler. His theories came to be considered integral nationalistic but authentically Ukrainian. Unlike many Ukrainian politicians of his time, he opposed any ideas of consensus and cooperation with the Russian government. His views grew out the study of historical Ukrainian-Russian relationships, primarily.

During this time, he edited several journals and wrote numerous articles on Ukrainian nationalism. In a style of analysis more typical of Russia’s intelligentisia, Dontsove exhibited a doctrinaire turn of mind with simplified, reductionist formulas, and radical ideological solutions.  His writings lambasted the failures of Ukrainians to achieve independence in 1917-1921, ridiculed Ukrainian figures from that era, and proposed a new "nationalism of the deed" and a united "national will" in which violence was a necessary instrument to overthrow the old order. He condemned the Polonophilia, Russophilia, and Austrophilia of various segments of contemporary Ukrainian society. In his writings, Dontsov called for the birth of a "new man" with "hot faith and stone heart" (гарячої віри й кам'яного серця) who would not be afraid to mercilessly destroy Ukraine's enemies. He believed in the sacredness of national culture and that it should be protected by any means necessary. His fiery exhortations had a profound influence on many of Ukraine's youth who experienced the oppression of their nation and who were disillusioned with democracy.

Although he did not become a member of the Organization of Ukrainian Nationalists, his writings served as an inspiration for OUN members and many Ukrainians not only in Galicia but in Volyn as well, where OUN influence had been negligible before 1941 and the local Ukrainian movement had been led by the Communist Party of Western Ukraine and where his writings were sold even more than in Galicia.

Exile and legacy
In 1939, on the eve of the Soviet Invasion of Poland, Dontsov left Poland, living in Bucharest, Prague, Germany, Paris and the United States. In 1949, he moved to Montreal where he taught Ukrainian literature at the French-language Université de Montréal.  In later years he became a devotee of theosophy.

According to East Europe historian Timothy Snyder, Ukraine rejected Dontsov’s theory that it should be exclusively for and about people who spoke Ukrainian and shared Ukrainian culture.  His brand of ethnic nationalism lost out in favor of the pluralistic form championed by Vyacheslav Lypynsky and Ivan L. Rudnytsky. 

Dontsov died in 1973 in Montreal, and is buried in Bound Brook, New Jersey.

References

Bibliography

 A romantic in the era of pragmatism 
 Longing for the heroic - Dmytro Dontsov: a person of European spirit and Ukrainian mindset article by Dmytro Drozdovskyi 
 Encyclopedia of Ukraine 
 Dmytro Dontsov's life and examples of his work 
 Dontsov's view of Leninism 
 Belarusian translation of Dontsov's "Nationalism" 
 Archives of Dmytro Dontsov (Dmytro Dontsov fonds, R6132) are held at Library and Archives Canada 
 
 

1883 births
1973 deaths
People from Melitopol
People from Melitopolsky Uyezd
Ukrainian Social Democratic Labour Party politicians
Organization of Ukrainian Nationalists
Ukrinform people
Ukrainian writers
Ukrainian literary critics
Ukrainian refugees
Ukrainian publishers (people)
Ukrainian nationalists
Ukrainian male writers
20th-century Ukrainian journalists
Inmates of Bereza Kartuska Prison
Academic staff of the Université de Montréal
Burials at Ukrainian Orthodox Church Cemetery, South Bound Brook